In mathematics (specifically linear algebra, operator theory, and functional analysis) as well as physics, a linear operator  acting on an inner product space is called positive-semidefinite (or non-negative) if, for every ,  and , where  is the domain of . The operator is said to be positive-definite, and written , if  for all .

In physics (specifically quantum mechanics), such operators represent quantum states, via the density matrix formalism.

Cauchy–Schwarz inequality 

If  then

Indeed, let  Applying Cauchy–Schwarz inequality to the inner product

as  proves the claim.

It follows that  If  is defined everywhere, and  then

On H, if A ≥ 0 then A is symmetric 
Without loss of generality, let the inner product  be anti-linear on the first argument and linear on the second. (If the reverse is true, then we work with  instead). For  the polarization identity

and the fact that  for positive operators, show that  so  is symmetric.

In contrast with the complex case, a positive-semidefinite operator on a real Hilbert space  may not be symmetric. As a counterexample, define  to be an operator of rotation by an acute angle  Then  but  so  is not symmetric.

If A ≥ 0 and Dom A = H, then A is self-adjoint and bounded 
The symmetry of  implies that  and  For  to be self-adjoint, it is necessary that  In our case, the equality of domains holds because  so  is indeed self-adjoint. The fact that  is bounded now follows from the Hellinger–Toeplitz theorem.

This property does not hold on

Order in self-adjoint operators on H 
A natural ordering of self-adjoint operators arises from the definition of positive operators. Define  if the following hold:

 

It can be seen that a similar result as the Monotone convergence theorem holds for monotone increasing, bounded, self-adjoint operators on Hilbert spaces.

Application to physics: quantum states 

Every  is called a state or a density operator. (Since each pure state is identifiable with a unit vector  some sources define pure states to be unit elements from  States that are not pure are called mixed.

References 

 

Operator theory